Cornbread is an album by American jazz trumpeter Lee Morgan, released in 1967 on the Blue Note label. Recorded in September 1965, the album features performances by Morgan, along with sidemen Herbie Hancock, Billy Higgins, Jackie McLean, Hank Mobley, and Larry Ridley.

Track listing

All compositions by Lee Morgan, except where noted.
 "Cornbread" – 9:03
 "Our Man Higgins" – 8:54
 "Ceora" – 6:23
 "Ill Wind" (Harold Arlen, Ted Koehler) – 7:59
 "Most Like Lee" – 6:49

Personnel

Lee Morgan – trumpet, leader
Jackie McLean – alto saxophone
Hank Mobley – tenor saxophone
Herbie Hancock – piano
Larry Ridley – bass
Billy Higgins – drums

Charts

References

1967 albums
Blue Note Records albums
Lee Morgan albums
Albums produced by Alfred Lion
Albums recorded at Van Gelder Studio